John Paulsen (February 15, 1914 – June 5, 2011) was an American swimmer. He competed in the men's 200 metre breaststroke at the 1932 Summer Olympics.

References

External links
 

1914 births
2011 deaths
American male swimmers
Olympic swimmers of the United States
Swimmers at the 1932 Summer Olympics
Swimmers from Santa Monica, California